The 2018 Albanian Cup Final was a football match played on 27 May 2018 to decide the winner of the 2017–18 Albanian Cup, the 66th edition of Albania's primary football cup.

The match was between Skënderbeu Korçë and Laçi at the Elbasan Arena in Elbasan.

Skënderbeu Korçë won the final 1–0 for their first ever Albanian Cup title.

Match

Details

References

Cup Final
2018
Albanian Cup
Football in Elbasan
2010s in Elbasan
Sports competitions in Elbasan
Albanian Cup Final, 2018
Albanian Cup Final, 2018